Kyle Joseph Schwarber (born March 5, 1993) is an American professional baseball outfielder for the Philadelphia Phillies of Major League Baseball (MLB). He played college baseball for the Indiana Hoosiers and was a first-round selection in the 2014 MLB draft by the Chicago Cubs. He made his MLB debut with the Cubs in 2015 and has also played for the Washington Nationals and Boston Red Sox. He helped the Cubs win the 2016 World Series over the Cleveland Indians, ending their 108-year drought. Known for his powerful, hard-hit home runs, Schwarber led the National League in home runs during his 2022 debut season with the Phillies, winning his first Silver Slugger Award and contributing to their appearance in the 2022 World Series.

Early life
Schwarber attended Middletown High School in Middletown, Ohio. During his four years, he batted .408 with 18 home runs and 103 runs batted in (RBIs).

College career
Schwarber enrolled at the Indiana University Bloomington to play college baseball for the Indiana Hoosiers. As a freshman, Schwarber was named a freshman All-American by Louisville Slugger and Collegiate Baseball Newspaper after hitting .300/.390/.513 with eight home runs and 47 RBIs. As a sophomore in 2013, he hit .366/.456/.647 with 18 home runs and 54 RBIs in 61 games. He was named a first-team All-American by the National Collegiate Baseball Writers Association (NCBWA) After the season, Schwarber played for the United States collegiate national team during the summer. As a junior, he batted .348/.456/.643 with 13 home runs. He was a finalist for the Johnny Bench Award. He majored in recreational sports management.

In the 2012 college offseason, Schwarber played for the Wareham Gatemen of the Cape Cod Baseball League (CCBL). After winning the league championship with the Gatemen, Schwarber was awarded the playoff's most valuable player award. In June 2019, it was announced that he would join the CCBL Hall of Fame class of 2019.

Professional career

Draft and minor leagues

Schwarber was drafted by the Chicago Cubs in the first round, fourth overall, in the 2014 Major League Baseball draft. He signed on June 11. Upon being drafted, MLB.com analyst Bernie Pleskoff profiled Schwarber as a "game-changing" power-hitter. However, Pleskoff was critical of his base-running and fielding skills, commenting "Schwarber is sluggish on the bases and slow defensively". ESPN's Keith Law echoed a similar sentiment in his draft profile, noting "Schwarber might have the most raw power of any prospect in the class." Two pre-draft scouting reports by the MLB Scouting Bureau compared Schwarber's swinging mechanics to those of Jeff Bagwell, while also projecting him to play a role similar to Matt Stairs.

He made his professional debut with the Boise Hawks three days later, going 3-for-4 with a home run and three RBI. The Cubs then promoted him to the Kane County Cougars of the Class A Midwest League and the Daytona Cubs of the Class A-Advanced Florida State League before the end of the season. In 72 total games between the three teams, he slashed .344/.428/.634 with 18 home runs, 53 RBI, and 18 doubles.

Schwarber began the 2015 season with the Double-A Tennessee Smokies of the Southern League. In July 2015, he played in the All-Star Futures Game, where he was named the MVP of the game after hitting a go-ahead two-run triple for Team USA.

Chicago Cubs (2015–2020)

2015
The Cubs promoted Schwarber to the major leagues on June 16, 2015, to serve as a designated hitter for six games during interleague play. 
Schwarber made his major league debut as a position player that night, replacing ejected starting catcher Miguel Montero in the eighth inning against the Cleveland Indians at Wrigley Field. The following night, as a designated hitter, he got four hits in five at bats with two RBI and six total bases after the Cubs and Indians both traveled to Cleveland.
The Cubs sent Schwarber to the Triple-A Iowa Cubs of the Pacific Coast League after the six games. On July 16, 2015, Schwarber was recalled from Triple A Iowa, to rejoin the Cubs due to an injury to catcher Montero. On July 21, in a 5–4 extra-inning victory over the Cincinnati Reds, Schwarber hit a game-tying two-run homer in the ninth inning and a solo go-ahead home run in the top of the 13th to give the Cubs the lead. Over the course of the season he split time between catcher and outfield positions. He finished the 2015 regular season having played 69 games, recording a .246 batting average with 16 home runs, 52 runs scored, and 43 RBI in just 273 plate appearances. In the National League Wild Card Game, Schwarber drove in three runs and hit a long two-run home run to help the Cubs defeat the Pittsburgh Pirates, 4–0, and advance to the Division Series against the St. Louis Cardinals. In the NLDS, Schwarber helped the Cubs to a 3–1 series victory with two home runs, including a mammoth Game 4 homer that landed on top of the new Wrigley Field scoreboard in right field. The ball was removed during the 2015–16 off-season to prevent theft but was encased in Plexiglas and returned "to where it landed". In his eighth career postseason game, a 5–2 loss to the New York Mets in Game 3 of the 2015 National League Championship Series (NLCS), Schwarber set a Cubs record with his fifth career postseason home run and also the record for the most home runs in a single postseason by a player age 22 or younger, passing Miguel Cabrera.

2016

Schwarber only played two games before he was involved in an outfield collision with teammate Dexter Fowler on April 7, 2016, and was removed from the game with a left leg injury. Schwarber tore the anterior cruciate ligament and lateral collateral ligament in his left knee, and would miss the rest of the 2016 season. Despite being injured, there were many trade rumors surrounding Schwarber during the season, especially regarding the Cubs desire for a premium reliever. Club president Theo Epstein addressed Schwarber's situation by saying it "wouldn't be right to trade him". The Cubs eventually acquired closer Aroldis Chapman from the New York Yankees without having to give up Schwarber. As the Cubs advanced further into the postseason, an unexpectedly fast recovery made the return of Schwarber increasingly more of a possibility. Schwarber participated in a successful on-field workout with the team at Dodger Stadium before Game 3 of the 2016 NLCS. On October 22, Schwarber went to the Arizona Fall League to play with the Mesa Solar Sox, the same day the Cubs played in Game 6 of the NLCS.

The Cubs added Schwarber to their roster for the 2016 World Series, and started him in Game 1 as their designated hitter. Schwarber's addition to the Cubs' starting line-up was surprising given he had not played in a Major League game since his injury in April. Schwarber hit a double off the right-field wall in the 4th inning of Game 1. He became the first major league position player in baseball history to get his first hit of the season during the World Series. He was not medically cleared to play on defense, and only made appearances as a pinch or designated hitter. Schwarber and the Cubs defeated the Indians in seven games to claim the Cubs' first World Series championship in 108 years. During the World Series, Schwarber recorded seven hits, including one double, two RBI, and one stolen base while batting for a .412 batting average and maintaining a .500 on-base percentage.

2017
Schwarber was the opening day starting left fielder and lead-off hitter during April and May for the 2017 Chicago Cubs season. Schwarber started the first third of the year with one of the worst batting averages in all of baseball, hitting just .120 for the month of May. When he was demoted to Triple-A on June 22 he had 12 home runs and 28 RBI but his batting average was the lowest in baseball, he was averaging one strike out every three at-bats and was hitting just .143 against left-handers. Schwarber returned to the Cubs active roster on July 6, after the All-Star break. By August 12, he had hit safely in 10 of 13 games with five home runs, three doubles and a triple. He had struck out 106 times in 300 plate appearances. Schwarber hit .288 with a .954 OPS in 59 September at-bats, hit six homers to finish with 30 and raised his season average from .168 on July 6 to .211 by the end of the year.

2018–2020
During the off-season Schwarber implemented a strict workout regimen and lost 30 pounds. Schwarber hit 55 home runs during three stages of the 2018 Major League Baseball Home Run Derby and finished second to Washington Nationals hometown hero Bryce Harper in the final round, 19–18. For the season, he batted .238 with 26 home runs, 14 doubles and 61 RBI.

In 2019, Schwarber batted .250/.339/.531 with 38 home runs and 92 RBI. He was thrown the highest percentage of curveballs of all major league batters (14.7%). In 2019, on defense he led all National League left fielders in errors, with six, and had the lowest fielding percentage of all major league left fielders (.974).

In 2020, Schwarber batted .188/.308/.393, and had the lowest batting average of all qualified NL batters. On December 2, the Cubs non-tendered Schwarber.

Washington Nationals (2021)
On January 9, 2021, the Washington Nationals announced they had signed Schwarber to a one-year major league contract containing a mutual option for 2022. After a slow start to the season, Schwarber went on a tear in June, hitting 16 home runs in an 18-game span from June 12 to 29. He had 5 multi-homer games during the stretch, including a 3-homer game against the New York Mets on June 20 and he slashed .280/.362/.760. This was the most home runs hit in any month in Nationals franchise history, and the second-most ever hit in the month of June in Major League history. Schwarber and Frank Howard during the 1968 Washington Senators season are the only two MLB players to hit 11 home runs in 9 games. He was named the National League Player of the Month for his efforts. On July 3, he was added to the injured list with a right hamstring strain. Schwarber appeared in 72 games with the Nationals, batting .253 with 25 home runs and 53 RBIs.

Boston Red Sox (2021)
On July 29, 2021, Schwarber was traded to the Boston Red Sox in exchange for minor-league pitcher Aldo Ramirez. He was activated from the injured list on August 13 and made his Red Sox debut that evening against the Baltimore Orioles.  In a change from his outfield role, the Red Sox had him learn first base, where he had mixed success defensively. Through the end of the regular season, Schwarber played in 41 games for Boston, batting .291 with seven home runs and 18 RBIs. He then played in 11 postseason games, batting 9-for-44 (.205) as the Red Sox advanced to the American League Championship Series (ALCS). In Game 3 of the ALCS, Schwarber hit a grand slam that was Boston's third in two games, setting an MLB record for the most grand slams in a postseason series. On November 5, he declined his half of a mutual option and became a free agent.

Philadelphia Phillies (2022–present)

On March 20, 2022, Schwarber agreed to join the Philadelphia Phillies on a four-year, $79 million contract.

Schwarber was awarded NL Player of the Month honors for June of 2022, after batting .272 with 12 home runs (most of all MLB players in June), with an OPS+ of 189 in 27 games. On September 16, 2022, Schwarber hit his 31st home run at the leadoff spot, breaking Jimmy Rollins' Phillies franchise record for most home runs at that spot in the batting order. 

In 155 games in the regular season in 2022, Schwarber finished with a .218 batting average, 100 runs scored, an NL-leading 46 home runs, and 94 RBIs. He also struck out an MLB-leading 200 times. He had the highest fly-ball percentage of all major leaguers (51.1%).

In the first game of the National League Championship Series, Schwarber hit a  home run at Petco Park, which was both the farthest hit ball ever tracked by StatCast at that stadium and by a Phillie. Schwarber hit two more home runs in the series as the Phillies defeated the Padres in five games, reaching their first World Series since 2009.

In the 2022 World Series against the Houston Astros, Schwarber batted .250 with five hits and four RBIs in six games. He also had the most home runs of any player in the series with three, including a game-tying solo shot to lead-off Game 5 off of Justin Verlander and a go-ahead solo shot in Game 6 off of Framber Valdez in the top of the sixth inning; however, the Phillies would lose both games and the series.

Schwarber is credited with introducing the song "Dancing On My Own” to the Phillies clubhouse and the song was played after every Phillies win during their run to the 2022 World Series.

International career
On December 6, 2022, the United States national baseball team announced that Schwarber had committed to play in the 2023 World Baseball Classic. During Team USA's first game of the tournament on March 11, 2023, against Great Britain, Schwarber hit a three-run home run to aid in a 6–1 victory.

Personal life
Schwarber is the son of Greg, a retired police chief, and Donna Schwarber. He has three sisters. Kyle's uncle Thomas Schwarber played college baseball as a pitcher at Ohio State and played professionally in the Detroit Tigers minor league system for three seasons from 1991 to 1993. Schwarber played football as a linebacker in high school and also participated in Middletown High School's show choir. He grew up a Cincinnati Reds fan. Schwarber chose "Schwarbs" as his nickname for the Players Weekend during the 2017 season.

Schwarber and his wife, Paige, were married in December 2019.

Charity work 
In 2017, while with the Chicago Cubs, Schwarber launched "Schwarber's Neighborhood Heroes" to honor and give back to first responders. and also hosted his first inaugural fundraiser, "Schwarber's Block Party", to help raise funds for first responders.  On August 23rd, 2019, Schwarber held his third and final annual block party.

References

External links

Indiana Hoosiers bio

1993 births
Living people
All-American college baseball players
American people of German descent
Baseball players from Ohio
Boise Hawks players
Boston Red Sox players
Chicago Cubs players
Daytona Cubs players
Indiana Hoosiers baseball players
Iowa Cubs players
Kane County Cougars players
Major League Baseball catchers
Major League Baseball left fielders
National League All-Stars
National League home run champions
Philadelphia Phillies players
Silver Slugger Award winners
Sportspeople from Middletown, Ohio
Tennessee Smokies players
United States national baseball team players
Wareham Gatemen players
Washington Nationals players
2023 World Baseball Classic players